Howell is the largest city and county seat of Livingston County, Michigan.  As of the 2010 census, the city had a population of 9,489.  The city is mostly surrounded by Howell Township, but the two are administered autonomously.  Howell is part of the South Lyon–Howell–Brighton Urban Area, which is an extension of the larger Detroit–Warren–Dearborn (Metro Detroit) Metropolitan Statistical Area.

History

January 1836 saw the establishment of the first post office. Flavius J. B. Crane was postmaster and the post office was in the Eagle Tavern. In March of this same year, there was a mail route started between Howell and the village of Kensington, and west to Grand Rapids.

The City of Howell is the county seat of Livingston County. On 24 March 1836, the legislature passed an act organizing Livingston County and Howell was slated to become the county seat. This claim was vigorously opposed by a group from Brighton and was not wholly relinquished by them until the county buildings were erected 12 years later. Howell at once assumed the dignity of the county seat.

The town was originally called Livingston Center and was established as a village by an act of Legislature on 14 March 1863, consisting of sections 35 and 36, and the south half of sections 25 and 26 of Howell Township.

The Howell Home Rule City Charter was initially adopted in 1955.

Geography

Major highways

 (unsigned)

Demographics

As of 2000, the city's median household income was $43,958 and the median family income was $57,149. Males had a median income of $44,980 versus $27,956 for females. The city's per capita income was $22,254. About 4.6% of families and 6.6% of the population were below the poverty line, including 7.2% of those under the age of 18 and 7.9% of those 65 and older.

2010 census
As of the census of 2010, the city had 9,489 people, 4,028 households, and 2,237 families. The city's racial makeup was 94.8% White, 0.4% African American, 0.7% Native American, 1.1% Asian, 0.3% Pacific Islander, 1.3% from other races, and 1.3% from two or more races. Hispanic or Latino people of any race were 3.5% of the population.

There were 4,028 households, of which 30.4% had children under the age of 18 living with them, 36.8% were married couples living together, 13.6% had a female householder with no husband present, 5.1% had a male householder with no wife present, and 44.5% were non-families. 36.6% of all households were made up of individuals, and 12% had someone living alone who was 65 years of age or older. The average household size was 2.25 and the average family size was 2.97.

The median age in the city was 35.2 years. 23.2% of the city's population was under age 18; 10.1% was between the age 18 and 24; 29.8% was from age 25 to 44; 23.6% was from age 45 to 64; and 13.5% was age 65 or older. The city's gender makeup was 48.2% male and 51.8% female.

Historic reputation 
For many decades, Howell had the reputation of being associated with the Ku Klux Klan due to White Supremacist leader and Michigan Grand Dragon 1971-1979 Robert E. Miles, who held KKK gatherings on his farm 12 miles north of the city in Cohoctah Township with a Howell mailing address. Miles died in 1992, but the gatherings, including the burning of crosses, continued. The reputation persisted into the 2000s, with events such as a public auction of KKK items scheduled for Martin Luther King Jr.'s birthday in January 2005, the 2010 suspension of a teacher who removed students for wearing a Confederate flag and making antigay slurs, students' racist tweets toward a racially mixed team in 2014, and pro-KKK vandalism in 2021.

The Livingston Diversity Council, founded in response to a 1988 cross-burning on the lawn of a black family, promotes diversity and inclusion in the county. While they are numerous in Metro Detroit, Howell is not listed as an active home to any hate group by the Southern Poverty Law Center.

Education

Elementary schools
Three Fires Elementary School (Timberwolves)
Northwest Elementary School (Eagles)
Southwest Elementary School (Coyotes)
Southeast Elementary School (Super Stars) (closed 2017)
Challenger Elementary School (champions) 
Voyager Elementary School (Vikings)
Hutchings Elementary School (Huskies)
St. Joseph Catholic Elementary School

Middle schools

Parker Middle School (Patriots)
Highlander Way Middle School (Hawks)

High schools

Howell High School (grades 10-12) (Highlanders)
Howell High School Freshman Campus (grade 9) (Highlanders)
Kensington Woods High School (Bears)

Higher Education institutions

Cleary University (Cougars)
Lansing Community College

Other Schools

Innovation Academy (Ravens)

Libraries
The Carnegie District Library

Climate
This climatic region is typified by large seasonal temperature differences, with warm to hot (and often humid) summers and cold (sometimes severely cold) winters. According to the Köppen Climate Classification system, Howell has a humid continental climate, abbreviated "Dfb" on climate maps.

Notable people
Bones – rapper and singer
Donald Burgett – World War II veteran and author
Timothy Busfield – actor and director
Melissa Gilbert – actress and author
T.J. Hensick – former hockey player who last played in the ECHL
Andy Hilbert – hockey player who last played for Minnesota Wild
William Mather Lewis – president of George Washington University, mayor of Lake Forest, Illinois
Robert E. Miles - pastor of the Mountain Church of Jesus Christ the Savior, prominent KKK member
Mike Rogers – United States Congressman
Mark Schauer – former United States Congressman and Michigan gubernatorial candidate in 2014
Bert Tooley – shortstop for the Brooklyn Dodgers, 1911–1912
Heywood Banks - Musician, poet, comedian, cult icon, and multilingual Toast chef/connoisseur

References

External links

City website

Cities in Livingston County, Michigan
County seats in Michigan
Ku Klux Klan in Michigan